The 1956–57 Landsdelsserien was a Norwegian second-tier football league season.

The league was contested by 54 teams, divided into a total of seven groups from four districts; Østland/Søndre, Østland/Nordre, Sørland/Vestre and Møre/Trøndelag. The two group winners in the Østland districts, Eik and Raufoss promoted directly to the 1957–58 Hovedserien. The other five group winners qualified for promotion play-offs to compete for two spots in the following season's top flight. Brann and Molde won the play-offs and were promoted.

Tables

District Østland/Søndre

District Østland/Nordre

District Sørland/Vestland

Group A1

Group A2

Group B

District Møre/Trøndelag

Møre

Trøndelag

Promotion play-offs
Sørland/Vestland 
Results A1–A2
Stavanger 4–1 Donn
Results A–B
Brann 4–1 Stavanger 

Brann won 4–1 over Stavanger and were promoted to Hovedserien.

Møre/Trøndelag
Molde 0–1 Sverre
Sverre 2–5 Molde

Molde won 5–3 on aggregate and were promoted to Hovedserien.

References

Norwegian First Division seasons
1956 in Norwegian football
1957 in Norwegian football
Norway